Nicole Dal Santo (born 25 August 1995) is an Italian professional racing cyclist. She rides for the Top Girls Fassa Bortolo team. She is also a model, reaching the final of the Miss Ciclismo 2016 competition.

See also
 List of 2015 UCI Women's Teams and riders

References

External links
 

1995 births
Living people
Italian female cyclists
Place of birth missing (living people)
People from Schio
Cyclists from the Province of Vicenza
University of Verona alumni